Valentina Cozma (born 14 August 1963) is a retired Romanian handball player, considered one of the best pivots in the history of Romanian handball.

Achievements
 Women's EHF Champions League: Winner 1996 (with Podravka Koprivnica)
 EHF Women's Champions Trophy: Winner 1996 (with Podravka Koprivnica)

References

1963 births
Living people
Sportspeople from Iași
Romanian female handball players
RK Podravka Koprivnica players